
The Defence Force Service Medal (DFSM) is an Australian Military award given for long service by permanent members of the Australian Defence Force.  It is part of the suite of defence force service awards introduced in 1982, which also included the Reserve Force Decoration (RFD, for officers of the Australian Defence Force Reserves) and the Reserve Force Medal (RFM, for non-commissioned members of the Reserve forces). 

All three medals were replaced with effect 20 April 1999 with a single medal, the Defence Long Service Medal, which is now awarded to all permanent and reserve members irrespective of rank. 

Additional service clasps are issued for each further 5 years after the initial 15 year qualifying service period. On the ribbon, a rosette indicates the award of each clasp, although the fifth and subsequent clasps are indicated by a small Federation Star. With the introduction of the Defence Long Service Medal, the DFSM is now a closed award with only clasps to existing awards continuing to be issued.

Description
 The DFSM is a cupro-nickel circular chamfered medal. The obverse has the Joint Service Emblem.
 The reverse is inscribed "For Efficient Service in the Permanent Forces" in capital letters around the circumference.
 The ribbon has three equal stripes of gold and azure-blue edged with azure-blue. The colours were the national colours of Australia at the time of introduction.
 The clasp is a cupro-nickel bar with the Royal Cypher flanked by sprigs of wattle in the centre. When the ribbon is worn alone a clasp is indicated by the addition of a cupro-nickel round rosette, or a silver miniature Federation Star.

Other Australian long service awards
Other Australian long service awards include:
 Reserve Force Decoration
 Reserve Force Medal
 Defence Long Service Medal
 National Medal
 Australian Cadet Forces Service Medal

Australian Defence Medal
While not awarded for "long service" per se, the Australian Defence Medal is sometimes classified as a "long service medal" – it is intended to recognise all those who completed an obligation to serve their country (whether voluntarily or conscripted).

See also
 Australian Honours Order of Precedence
 Australian Honours System

References

External links
 Defence Force Service Medal, itsanhonour.gov.au
 DFSM Fact Sheet, itsanhonour.gov.au
 Number awarded, itsanhonour.gov.au

Military awards and decorations of Australia
1982 establishments in Australia
Awards established in 1982
Long and Meritorious Service Medals of Britain and the Commonwealth